
Gmina Szczutowo is a rural gmina (administrative district) in Sierpc County, Masovian Voivodeship, in east-central Poland. Its seat is the village of Szczutowo, which lies approximately 11 kilometres (7 mi) north-west of Sierpc and 125 km (78 mi) north-west of Warsaw.

Villages
Gmina Szczutowo contains the villages and settlements of Agnieszkowo, Białasy, Blinno, Blizno, Całownia, Cisse, Dąbkowa Parowa, Dziki Bór, Gójsk, Gorzeń, Grabal, Grądy, Gugoły, Jaźwiny, Józefowo, Karlewo, Łazy, Maluszyn, Mierzęcin, Modrzewie, Mościska, Podlesie, Słupia, Stara Wola, Szczechowo and Szczutowo.

Neighbouring gminas
Gmina Szczutowo is bordered by the gminas of Rogowo, Rościszewo, Sierpc, Skępe and Skrwilno.

References
Polish official population figures 2006

Szczutowo
Sierpc County